Downton Hall is a privately owned 18th-century country house at Stanton Lacy, near Ludlow, Shropshire. It is a Grade II* listed building.

The house was built about 1733 by Wredenhall Pearce, who had inherited the estate in 1731.
The new house, designed by William Smith Jr. of Warwick, of three storeys and with a twelve-bay frontage carrying a balustraded parapet, boasts an unusual circular entrance hall with Ionic columns and a honeysuckle frieze.

In 1781 Catherine Hall, daughter and heir of William Pearce Hall married Charles William Rouse-Boughton MP (see Boughton Baronets). Improvements to the house in 1824 included a new entrance front, designed by architect Edward Haycock, with a Doric style portico.

Sir Charles Henry Rouse-Boughton was resident in 1881 with his family and nine domestic servants. Following the death of the last Baronet in 1963 his daughter Miss MF Rouse-Boughton continued to live at the Hall.

See also
Grade II* listed buildings in Shropshire Council (A–G)
Listed buildings in Stanton Lacy

References

Country houses in Shropshire
Grade II* listed buildings in Shropshire
Grade II* listed houses
Houses completed in 1733